Nanaysky District is an administrative and municipal district (raion), one of the seventeen in Khabarovsk Krai, Russia. Its administrative center is the rural locality (a selo) of Troitskoye. Population:  The population of Troitskoye accounts for 29.4% of the district's total population.

Anyuysky National Park is located in Nanaysky District.

Geography
The Gur Swamps are an important wetland area located on the right bank of the Gur river in the district.

References

Sources

Districts of Khabarovsk Krai